The 1897 Boston Beaneaters season was the 27th season of the franchise. The Beaneaters won the National League pennant, their fourth of the decade and their seventh overall. After the season, the Beaneaters played in the Temple Cup for the first time. They lost the series to the second-place Baltimore Orioles, 4 games to 1.

Regular season 

This team has been cited (along with the 1880s St. Louis Browns and the 1890s Baltimore Orioles) as one of the greatest of the 19th century. It featured five Hall of Famers: manager Frank Selee, pitcher Kid Nichols, third baseman Jimmy Collins, and outfielders Billy Hamilton and Hugh Duffy.

In just 132 games, the Beaneaters scored 1025 runs to lead the league (Hamilton had 152 of them to win individual honors). They also allowed the fewest, on the way to a .705 winning percentage. Nichols was one of the premier pitchers in the league, leading the NL with 31 wins. His 2.64 ERA ranked second.

Season standings

Record vs. opponents

Roster

Player stats

Batting

Starters by position 
Note: Pos = Position; G = Games played; AB = At bats; H = Hits; Avg. = Batting average; HR = Home runs; RBI = Runs batted in

Other batters 
Note: G = Games played; AB = At bats; H = Hits; Avg. = Batting average; HR = Home runs; RBI = Runs batted in

Pitching

Starting pitchers 
Note: G = Games pitched; IP = Innings pitched; W = Wins; L = Losses; ERA = Earned run average; SO = Strikeouts

Other pitchers 
Note: G = Games pitched; IP = Innings pitched; W = Wins; L = Losses; ERA = Earned run average; SO = Strikeouts

Relief pitchers 
Note: G = Games pitched; W = Wins; L = Losses; SV = Saves; ERA = Earned run average; SO = Strikeouts

Awards and honors

League top ten finishers 
Jimmy Collins
 #2 in NL in RBI (132)

Hugh Duffy
 NL leader in home runs (11)
 #3 in NL in RBI (129)

Sliding Billy Hamilton
 NL leader in runs scored (152)
 #3 in NL in stolen bases (66)

Fred Klobedanz
 #3 in NL in wins (26)

Kid Nichols
 NL leader in wins (31)
 #2 in NL in ERA (2.64)

References 
1897 Boston Beaneaters season at Baseball Reference

Boston Beaneaters seasons
Boston Beaneaters
Boston Beaneaters
19th century in Boston
National League champion seasons